The Institute of Ukrainian Archeography and Source Studies of the National Academy of Sciences of Ukraine is a historical institute based in Kyiv, Ukraine, and part of the National Academy of Sciences of Ukraine. It was established in 1990, and publishes a number of research studies focused on historical topics, such as Upokorennya holodom, a collection of sources on the Ukrainian famine. It is named after Mykhailo Hrushevsky.

References

Institutes of the National Academy of Sciences of Ukraine
Research institutes in Kyiv